Gift of perseverance is the doctrine of Augustine of Hippo that persevering in the faith is a gift given by God, but a person can never know if they have the gift. According to Augustine, without having the gift of perseverance a person is damned, even if he seems to have been elected by grace. Augustine himself also believed that Cyprian held a similar view about perseverance being a work of God, and thus foreshadowing the Augustinian view. Some Calvinists argue that the Augustinian view foreshadows the Calvinist doctrine of perseverance of the saints.

Background 
Augustine believed that one receives the Holy Spirit at their baptism, which produces salvation. However Augustine wanted to explain why some regenerate people fall away from the faith, even though both groups had the Holy Spirit. Thus Augustine concluded that some people are given a second gift of perseverance, which is only given to some regenerate people.

Doctrine 
Augustine defined perseverance as gift by which one perseveres up to the end of their lives, if a person dies as a believer they had been given the gift, but if one dies as an unbeliever, even if he used to once believe, he did not have this gift given. Augustine believed that the gift can be received through prayer, but when one person has the gift, they can't lose it.

See also 
Predestination
Eternal security

References 

Christian philosophy
Christian soteriology
Christian terminology

External links 
On the Predestination of the Saints